Muthspiel is a surname. Notable people with the surname include: 

Agnes Muthspiel (1914-1966), Austrian painter
Christian Muthspiel (born 1962), Austrian composer, trombonist, and pianist
Wolfgang Muthspiel (born 1965), Austrian jazz guitarist and record label owner